Skogvollvatnet is a lake in Andøy Municipality in Nordland county, Norway. The  lake lies on the west coast of the island of Andøya. The tiny village of Skogvoll lies on the isthmus between the lake and the ocean.

See also
 List of lakes in Norway

References

Andøy
Lakes of Nordland
Ramsar sites in Norway